Early parliamentary elections were held in Ukraine on 30 September 2007. The election date was determined following agreement between the President Viktor Yushchenko, the Prime Minister Viktor Yanukovych and the Chairman of the Verkhovna Rada (Ukrainian Parliament) Oleksandr Moroz on 27 May 2007, in an attempt to resolve the political crisis in Ukraine triggered by the 2 April 2007 presidential decree on dissolution of Ukraine's parliament.

The 450 seats were divided among all parties that achieved a minimum 3% nationwide vote tally. The number of seats that are allocated to each party, above the 3% participation rate quota, is calculated using the Hamilton method of apportionment.

In the election, an alliance of two electoral blocs associated with the Orange Revolution, Yulia Tymoshenko's Bloc (BYuT) and Our Ukraine-Peoples Self Defence (OU-PSD) obtained a narrow majority  leaving their main rival, the Party of Regions (PoR) in opposition.

Background

Following the 2006 parliamentary elections, there was an ongoing power struggle between the President and the parliamentary majority, which resulted in the dissolution of parliament. The majority in the parliament, known as Coalition of National Unity, was formed by Party of Regions, Communist Party, and Socialist Party). It was opposed by Yulia Tymoshenko Bloc and Our Ukraine.

Early in 2007, several members of the opposition indicated their support to the ruling coalition. If sufficient numbers of members of parliament supported the government, the Coalition of National Unity could have secured a two-thirds majority, empowering the parliament to override the president's right of veto and enabling the parliament to initiate limited constitutional changes.

On 2 April 2007, Yushchenko decreed the dissolution of the Verkhovna Rada.

The authority of the president to dismiss the parliament was challenged in the Constitutional Court, however following the president's intervention in the operation of the Constitutional Court the court has not ruled on the constitutionality of the president's decree.

The election was originally scheduled to be held on 27 May 2007 and later postponed to 24 June 2007. On 27 May 2007 an agreement was signed by President Viktor Yushchenko, Prime Minister Viktor Yanukovych, and Parliamentary Speaker Oleksandr Moroz, scheduling the elections to be held on 30 September 2007.

The President's previous decrees were revoked and a new decree based on the provisions of Article 82 and Article 90 of Ukraine's Constitution was issued in its place in August 2007 following the resignation of over 150 members of the opposition parties.

Timetable
 August 2 - Commencement of Official Campaign
 August 3 - The Central Election Commission of Ukraine (CVK) is to make decision about giving an airtime for blocs and parties at the budget expense
 August 4 - The CVK must hold a draw to establish broadcast priorities; Deadline for setting of the ballot’s form and text
 August 14 - The CVK has to prepare information placards of election participants and send them to district election commissions
 August 22 - Ballots papers to be submitted for printing
 August 24 - Close of Registration by Foreign Observers
 August 25 - Close of Party List nominations; State television and radio broadcasters should submit a schedule of parties and bloc’s commercial
 August 28 - CVK verification of nominations finalized
 August 30 - Party and Block registration documentation deadline; Close of registration for civil organizations to petition for participation of official observers
 September 2 - Official publication of Election List
 September 26 - Border Services to submit list of Ukrainian Citizens who have left the country and have not returned
 September 30 - Parliamentary Elections
 October 15 - Preliminary announcement of election results
 October 20 - Official final announcement of election results

Registered parties and blocs
Number in parentheses is the number of candidates included on the party list. Parties or blocs that obtained 3% or more of the vote are in bold.

Communist Party of Ukraine (444)
Party of Regions (450)
Progressive Socialist Party of Ukraine (403)
Our Ukraine–People's Self-Defense Bloc (401)
All-Ukrainian Union "Freedom" (351)
Lytvyn's Bloc (260)
Yulia Tymoshenko Bloc (447)
Socialist Party of Ukraine (282)
All-Ukrainian Party of People's Trust (86)
Party of National Economic Development of Ukraine (136)
Bloc "All-Ukrainian Community" (103)
Electoral bloc of Liudmyla Suprun – Ukrainian Regional Asset (387)
Party of Free Democrats (85)
Communist Party of Ukraine (renewed) (41)
Peasant's Bloc "Agricultural Ukraine" (136)
Party of Greens of Ukraine (147)
Ukrainian People's Bloc (213)
Electoral bloc of political parties "KUCHMA" (168)
Bloc of Party of Pensioners of Ukraine (92)
Christian's Bloc (225)

Conduct
3354 international observers were officially registered to monitor the conduct of the election.
 
Representatives of the Council of Europe, the Organization for Security and Co-operation in Europe (OSCE) and Fair Election organization registered officials with the Central Elections Committee. The OSCE closely worked with Ukrainian officials in the design, administration, and conduct of the election.

Observers declared that elections generally met international standards for democratic elections. However they noted:
 delays in the formation of district and precinct election commissions
 the inadequate quality of voter lists
 possible disenfranchisement of voters due to law amendments on:
 abolishment of absentee ballots
 removing from lists voters who have crossed the state border after 1 August 2007.
 modalities for voting at home
 extensive campaigning by state and local officials from all sides in violation of law.

Exit polls

Results
The first polling places to open were at the Ukrainian embassies in Australia and Japan. Election districts were open from 7:00AM until 10:00PM local time. According to the Central Election Commission of Ukraine 63.22% of registered voters cast ballots. This easily exceeded the 50% participation required by Ukrainian law to make the election valid.

Five parties received the required election threshold of 3% of the total vote and entered the Verkhovna Rada: Party of Regions (PoR),
Bloc Yulia Tymoshenko (BYuT), Our Ukraine-Peoples Self Defence (OU-PSD), the Communist Party of Ukraine (CPU) and the Bloc Lytvyn (BL). The Socialist Party of Ukraine (SPU) secured only 2.86% of the vote and as such did not win any seats in the new parliament. Had the Socialist Party received an additional 0.14% of the vote the overall results would have been more or less the same as the previous Ukrainian parliamentary election in 2006 with the addition of Bloc Lytvyn representatives.

Support of leading parties and blocs by administrative regions

Maps

Comparison with previous elections
In 2006, 27% of the registered vote represented support for minor parties that received less than the 3% statutory representation threshold. In 2007 the number of voters that supported minor parties that received less than the 3% statutory threshold (Including the Socialist Party of Ukraine the support of 2.86%) was only 7%.

The 20% difference shows a consolidation of voter's support towards major political parties. This fact needs to be taken into consideration when making any assessment as to the positive swing recorded for Bloc Yulia Tymoshenko, Party of Regions, The Communist Party of Ukraine and Bloc Lytvyn. The Our Ukraine bloc merged with the new party "People's Self-Defence" but only recorded a marginal gain in the overall percentage of the vote representing a reduction of 236964 votes in comparison with the 2006 data.

Further review of the regional vote shows a consolidation of the vote by Yulia Tymoshenko in regions in which her party already maintained strong support. Apart from the Socialist Party of Ukraine and a marginal gain by Our Ukraine all major political parties recorded an increase in the overall percentage the voter support when comparing the 2006 to 2007 results.

The other fact that needs to also be considered is that in 2006 the participation rate was 67% and in 2007 the participation rate dropped down to 62%.

Charts

Charts 2006

|-
!rowspan=2 | Region
! colspan=2 style="text-align:center;" | PR
! colspan=2 style="text-align:center;" | BYuT
! colspan=2 style="text-align:center;" | OU / UO-PSD
! colspan=2 style="text-align:center;" | SPU
! colspan=2 style="text-align:center;" | CPU
|-
!2006
!2007
!2006
!2007
!2006
!2007
!2006
!2007
!2006
!2007
|-
!|Ukraine
!32.1
!34.4
!22.3
!30.7
!14.0
!14.2
!5.7
!2.9
!3.7
!5.4
|-
|Autonomous Republic Crimea
|58.0
|61.0
|6.5
|6.9
|7.6
|8.2
|1.2
|1.9
|4.5
|7.6
|-
|Vinnytsia Oblast
|8.2
|12.6
|33.3
|50.0
|20.0
|18.6
|14.7
|2.5
|3.4
|5.0
|-
|Volyn Oblast
|4.5
|6.7
|43.9
|57.6
|20.7
|20.0
|4.1
|1.9
|2.2
|2.7
|-
|Dnepropetrovsk Oblast
|45.0
|48.2
|15.0
|20.9
|5.3
|6.3
|3.8
|1.4
|5.7
|7.6
|-
|Donetsk Oblast
|73.6
|72.1
|2.5
|3.9
|1.4
|1.6
|3.7
|8.0
|3.1
|6.0
|-
|Zhytomyr Oblast
|18.0
|22.4
|24.9
|37.0
|17.5
|15.1
|8.9
|2.5
|5.4
|5.8
|-
|Zakarpattia Oblast
|18.7
|19.8
|20.3
|28.9
|25.8
|31.1
|3.6
|3.5
|1.3
|1.8
|-
|Zaporizhzhia Oblast
|51.2
|55.5
|10.9
|14.7
|5.3
|4.7
|2.9
|2.3
|5.3
|8.3
|-
|Ivano-Frankivsk Oblast
|1.9
|3.0
|30.4
|50.7
|45.1
|36.8
|2.3
|0.8
|0.6
|0.8
|-
|Kyiv Oblast
|9.9
|13.0
|44.5
|53.4
|11.6
|15.1
|10.2
|2.1
|2.3
|2.9
|-
|Kirovohrad Oblast
|20.1
|27.0
|30.1
|37.6
|8.7
|11.7
|9.7
|2.8
|6.1
|6.4
|-
|Luhansk Oblast
|74.3
|73.5
|3.7
|5.0
|2.0
|1.7
|1.2
|1.2
|4.4
|8.4
|-
|Lviv Oblast
|3.0
|4.2
|33.0
|50.4
|38.0
|36.0
|2.2
|0.6
|0.7
|1.0
|-
|Mykolaiv Oblast
|50.3
|54.4
|11.9
|16.6
|5.6
|5.8
|4.3
|1.9
|5.3
|7.2
|-
|Odesa Oblast
|47.5
|52.2
|9.9
|13.7
|6.4
|6.5
|6.3
|7.2
|3.2
|6.2
|-
|Poltava Oblast
|20.4
|24.8
|26.8
|37.9
|13.2
|14.5
|12.7
|3.8
|5.4
|6.5
|-
|Rivne Oblast
|7.2
|10.4
|31.3
|51.0
|25.5
|20.8
|6.5
|2.1
|1.9
|2.4
|-
|Sumy Oblast
|10.9
|15.7
|33.3
|44.5
|19.4
|20.7
|10.6
|2.0
|5.4
|5.8
|-
|Ternopil Oblast
|2.0
|3.0
|34.5
|51.6
|34.2
|35.2
|3.7
|1.1
|0.4
|0.7
|-
|Kharkiv Oblast
|51.7
|49.6
|12.7
|16.4
|5.9
|8.1
|2.8
|2.6
|4.6
|8.3
|-
|Kherson Oblast
|39.1
|43.2
|17.4
|23.0
|9.8
|9.0
|4.8
|2.5
|6.8
|9.1
|-
|Khmelnytskyi Oblast
|10.0
|14.1
|35.6
|48.2
|18.3
|18.4
|9.2
|1.7
|3.1
|4.0
|-
|Cherkasy Oblast
|10.7
|15.5
|38.3
|47.0
|12.2
|15.3
|13.4
|4.3
|4.4
|4.9
|-
|Chernihiv Oblast
|15.6
|20.7
|33.9
|41.9
|10.3
|14.9
|12.9
|2.9
|5.5
|6.7
|-
|Chernivtsi Oblast
|12.7
|16.8
|30.3
|46.2
|27.0
|20.3
|4.5
|3.8
|1.7
|2.3
|-
|Kyiv
|11.8
|15.0
|39.2
|46.2
|15.8
|15.8
|5.5
|1.6
|3.0
|4.6
|-
|Sevastopol
|64.3
|64.5
|4.5
|5.0
|2.4
|2.3
|0.8
|2.7
|4.8
|10.3
|-
| colspan=11 style="text-align:left;" |Source: Central Election Commission of Ukraine (Ukrainian)
|}

|-
!rowspan=2 | Major cities
! colspan=2 style="text-align:center;" | PR
! colspan=2 style="text-align:center;" | BYuT
! colspan=2 style="text-align:center;" | OU / UO-PSD
! colspan=2 style="text-align:center;" | SPU
! colspan=2 style="text-align:center;" | CPU
|-
!2006
!2007
!2006
!2007
!2006
!2007
!2006
!2007
!2006
!2007
|-
!|Ukraine
!32.1
!34.4
!22.3
!30.7
!14.0
!14.2
!5.7
!2.9
!3.7
!5.4
|-
|Vinnytsia
|10.2
|13.5
|40.5
|54.2
|17.2
|14.3
|8.3
|2.0
|3.2
|4.7
|-
|Dnipropetrovsk
|41.1
|43.7
|16.3
|22.8
|6.2
|6.8
|3.4
|1.6
|4.2
|7.2
|-
|Donetsk
|72.6
|76.0
|2.7
|4.5
|1.8
|2.0
|1.0
|1.3
|2.9
|6.8
|-
|Zhytomyr
|21.2
|24.5
|31.2
|40.0
|12.9
|11.5
|6.1
|2.1
|5.1
|5.8
|-
|Zaporizhzhia
|44.2
|50.6
|14.6
|19.1
|6.6
|5.5
|2.5
|1.4
|5.0
|8.6
|-
|Kirovohrad
|18.9
|26.8
|39.6
|42.2
|7.5
|8.9
|5.2
|2.2
|5.0
|5.8
|-
|Kryvyi Rih
|47.3
|48.8
|14.2
|19.9
|5.8
|5.8
|2.9
|0.9
|8.3
|9.2
|-
|Luhansk
|70.5
|67.8
|5.5
|7.1
|2.0
|2.0
|0.9
|1.1
|3.4
|8.7
|-
|L'viv
|6.5
|8.4
|27.7
|43.6
|34.4
|34.1
|3.0
|0.9
|1.5
|2.4
|-
|Makiivka
|80.6
|82.6
|1.6
|3.1
|1.0
|1.1
|0.5
|0.6
|1.8
|4.8
|-
|Mariupol
|56.4
|42.6
|1.9
|3.1
|1.7
|1.6
|18.4
|42.4
|3.5
|4.1
|-
|Mykolaiv
|55.1
|59.4
|10.2
|13.8
|4.5
|4.4
|1.6
|1.2
|3.5
|6.8
|-
|Odesa
|44.2
|52.7
|13.0
|15.5
|6.9
|6.3
|4.8
|3.4
|2.5
|7.2
|-
|Poltava
|25.6
|26.8
|33.1
|41.1
|11.4
|10.5
|4.9
|1.9
|4.4
|6.3
|-
|Rivne
|10.1
|12.5
|32.2
|48.2
|19.8
|20.6
|8.0
|1.9
|2.7
|3.4
|-
|Simferopol
|56.0
|59.0
|6.5
|6.9
|5.2
|5.8
|0.9
|1.1
|5.2
|9.2
|-
|Sumy
|6.9
|10.8
|46.7
|55.8
|20.9
|18.1
|4.1
|1.2
|3.4
|3.7
|-
|Kharkiv
|49.5
|45.7
|14.7
|18.9
|6.9
|8.1
|1.7
|2.4
|3.8
|8.6
|-
|Chernihiv
|23.5
|28.5
|31.9
|36.1
|7.5
|10.1
|8.0
|2.8
|7.5
|7.0
|-
|Chernivtsi
|15.6
|19.8
|34.9
|45.8
|18.7
|16.8
|3.7
|1.6
|2.3
|3.6
|-
| colspan=11 style="text-align:left;" |Source: Central Election Commission of Ukraine (Ukrainian)
|}

Government formation

Following the announcement of preliminary election results, the parties expressed their position on forming the coalition. The Party of Regions announced itself a winner of the election and stated that it started negotiations on forming a ruling coalition. The party did not express the desire to be in opposition. Tymoshenko's Bloc advocated a coalition with Our Ukraine and possibly Lytvyn's Bloc. Yulia Tymoshenko was strongly against any coalition with the Party of Regions or the Communists. She stated that her Bloc would be in opposition should such a coalition be formed. President Yushchenko has expressed the need for a better relationship between coalition and opposition. This should be achieved by providing the opposition with posts in the parliament and the government. Lytvyn's Bloc received proposals from all top parties on forming a coalition. Leaders of the Bloc stated that their decision will be made at the party's assembly. Oleksandr Moroz, the leader of the Socialist Party of Ukraine, acknowledged his defeat on 4 October 2007 and supported Tymoshenko's bid for premiership.

Yulia Tymoshenko, following the formation of a coalition between the Yulia Tymoshenko Bloc and Our Ukraine–People's Self-Defense Bloc was subsequently elected prime-minister on 18 December 2007. Her candidacy was supported by the vote of 226 deputies.

The Verkhovna Rada of Ukraine is competent on the condition that no less than two-thirds of its constitutional composition has been elected. This means that if any one of the two largest parties resign en masse, the parliament would lose its authority and fresh elections would be required.

Parliamentary factions after the elections
After the election various factions were formed in parliament. It was possible for 15 or more deputies to form a parliamentary faction (a lawmaker could join only one faction; the chairman and his two assistants could not head factions of deputies). hence not all parties represented in the Verkhovna Rada had their own faction. Factions are colored raspberry.
Party of Regions
Bloc of Yulia Tymoshenko – Fatherland (In November 2010 the Bloc Yulia Tymoshenko faction in the Verkhovna Rada was officially renamed Bloc of Yulia Tymoshenko – Fatherland.)
All-Ukrainian Union Fatherland 
Reforms and Order Party, 
Our Ukraine–People's Self-Defense Bloc
People's Union "Our Ukraine"
Christian Democratic Union
People's Self-Defense Political Party (Former Forward, Ukraine!) 
People's Movement of Ukraine, 
Ukrainian People's Party
Ukrainian Platform "Sobor"
European Party of Ukraine
PORA
Motherland Defenders Party
Communist Party of Ukraine
People's Party faction (In November 2010 the Lytvyn Bloc faction in the Verkhovna Rada was renamed People's Party faction.)
 People's Party

Factions created during the convocation

Reforms for the Future

Leaders of factions/groups

 Oleksandr Yefremov (Party of Regions)
 Andriy Kozhemiakin (Bloc of Yulia Tymoshenko - Batkivshchyna)
 Mykola Martynenko (Our Ukraine–People's Self-Defense Bloc)
 Petro Symonenko (Communist Party of Ukraine)
 Ihor Sharov (People's Party, formerly Bloc of Volodymyr Lytvyn)
 Ihor Rybakov (Reforms for the Future)

Extra-parliamentary parties representation within the Verkhovna Rada

Front of Changes (Members were part of the Our Ukraine–People's Self-Defense Bloc faction.)
United Centre (Members were part of the Our Ukraine–People's Self-Defense Bloc faction.)
Communist Party of Workers and Peasants (Chairman Leonid Hrach was expelled from the Communist Party and its faction in the Verkhovna Rada in December 2010)
 Radical Party of Ukraine was represented by Oleh Lyashko (former Fatherland)
Ukraine – Forward! (the renamed Ukrainian Social-Democratic Party)

Parliamentary parties that dissolved or merged during the convocation

Strong Ukraine (Strong Ukraine merged with Party of Regions on March 17, 2012; the former members of Strong Ukraine remained part of the People's Party faction)

Faction changes after the 2007 elections
Numerous MPs were removed from their original faction after the 2007 election; several left their (original) faction to join another faction in October 2010. From 2006 till October 2010 this was not allowed because of the (so-called) "imperative mandate".

In November 2010 the Bloc Yulia Tymoshenko faction was officially renamed “Bloc Yulia Tymoshenko-Batkivschyna”. and the Bloc of Lytvyn faction was renamed People's Party faction. On February 16, 2011 a new parliamentary faction "Reforms for the Future" was created. The parliament elected in the following election on 28 October 2012 was appointed and started its tasks six weeks after the elections on 12 December 2012. The parliament elected in 2007 convened on 6 December 2012 for the last time.

|-
|style="background-color:#E9E9E9;text-align:left;vertical-align:top;" |Parties and alliances
!style="background-color:#E9E9E9"|Seats on September 30, 2007
! style="background-color:#E9E9E9;text-align:center;" |Seats on December 31, 2010
! style="background-color:#E9E9E9;text-align:center;" |Seats on December 31, 2011
! style="background-color:#E9E9E9;text-align:center;" |Seats in March 2012
! style="background-color:#E9E9E9;text-align:center;" |Seats in September 2012
! style="background-color:#E9E9E9;text-align:center;" |Seats in November 2012   
! style="background-color:#E9E9E9;text-align:center;" |Total loss/gain   
|-
| style="text-align:left;" |Party of Regions
| style="vertical-align:top;" |175
| style="vertical-align:top;" |180
| style="vertical-align:top;" |192
| style="vertical-align:top;" |192
| style="vertical-align:top;" |195
| style="vertical-align:top;" |195
| style="vertical-align:top;" | 20 seats
|-
| style="text-align:left;" |Bloc Yulia Tymoshenko
| style="vertical-align:top;" |156
| style="vertical-align:top;" |113
| style="vertical-align:top;" |102
| style="vertical-align:top;" |100
| style="vertical-align:top;" |98
| style="vertical-align:top;" |97
| style="vertical-align:top;" | 59 seats
|-
| style="text-align:left;" |Our Ukraine–People's Self-Defense Bloc
| style="vertical-align:top;" |72
| style="vertical-align:top;" |71
| style="vertical-align:top;" |65
| style="vertical-align:top;" |65
| style="vertical-align:top;" |63
| style="vertical-align:top;" |63
| style="vertical-align:top;" | 9 seats
|-
| style="text-align:left;" |Communist Party of Ukraine
| style="vertical-align:top;" |27
| style="vertical-align:top;" |25
| style="vertical-align:top;" |25
| style="vertical-align:top;" |25
| style="vertical-align:top;" |25
| style="vertical-align:top;" |25
| style="vertical-align:top;" | 2 seats
|-
| style="text-align:left;" |Lytvyn Bloc
| style="vertical-align:top;" |20
| style="vertical-align:top;" |20
| style="vertical-align:top;" |20
| style="vertical-align:top;" |20
| style="vertical-align:top;" |20
| style="vertical-align:top;" |20
| style="vertical-align:top;" |
|- 
| style="text-align:left;" |Reforms for the Future
| style="vertical-align:top;" |Did not exist
| style="vertical-align:top;" |Did not exist
| style="vertical-align:top;" |20
| style="vertical-align:top;" |19
| style="vertical-align:top;" |19
| style="vertical-align:top;" |19
| style="vertical-align:top;" | 19 seats
|- 
| style="text-align:left;" |Parliamentarians not members of faction 
| style="vertical-align:top;" |0
| style="vertical-align:top;" |41
| style="vertical-align:top;" |26
| style="vertical-align:top;" |29
| style="vertical-align:top;" |30
| style="vertical-align:top;" |31
| style="vertical-align:top;" | 31 seats
|}

See also
List of members of the parliament of Ukraine, 2007–2012

References

External links
Ukrainian parliamentary election, 2007 – Central Election Commission of Ukraine
Exit poll 2007
Serhiy Vasylchenko: Electoral Geography of Ukraine 1991 - 2010

Parliamentary elections in Ukraine
Ukraine
Parliamentary
Parliamentary
6th Ukrainian Verkhovna Rada